Jörg Ohm (14 March 1944 – 21 May 2020) was an East German football player who played in the DDR-Oberliga for both Chemie Leipzig and 1. FC Magdeburg. As a defender he won the championship four times between 1964 and 1975.

Ohm began to play football in the youth department of BSG Lokomotive Haldensleben, north of Magdeburg. In 1962 he joined the focus club of BSG Lokomotive, SC Lokomotive Leipzig, after playing four matches for the youth national team in the spring.

When football in Leipzig was reorganized in 1963, Ohm belonged to the players that joined BSG Chemie Leipzig – those players were thought to have less potential than their comrades who joined SC Leipzig. However, at the end of the 1963–64 season, BSG Chemie Leipzig won the championship, with Ohm appearing in four matches. He stayed with Chemie Leipzig until 1968 and appeared in 33 matches for the side. However, when they won the FDGB-Pokal in 1966, Ohm was missing from the final squad.

At the beginning of the 1968–69 season, Ohm joined 1. FC Magdeburg and won the cup for the first time in 1969. Not only did he play in the final this time, but also scored two goals in Magdeburg's 4–0 victory over FC Karl-Marx-Stadt. Three more seasons followed Ohm's second title. He was part of Magdeburg's championship squad in 1972 (7 matches), 1974 (3), and 1975 (3). However, he was neither part of the team that won the FDGB-Pokal again in 1973 nor did he play in the 1974 European Cup Winners' Cup Final when 1. FC Magdeburg won the title by defeating AC Milan. In fact, Ohm only played in one first round match in this European cup season. 1974 also marks the end of Ohm's Oberliga career. In his six years with 1. FC Magdeburg, he had played in 78 matches, bringing his total to 111. He went on to play for Magdeburg's reserve team until 1976, when the club retired him officially before Magdeburg met F.C. Hansa Rostock in the Oberliga.

After his playing career Ohm turned to managing, taking over second-tier club Stahl Blankenburg in 1976. The team had finished 9th in the previous season, and Ohm led them to four second and one third rank in the second-tier DDR-Liga, division C. Between 1981 and 1983 Ohm was in charge of another DDR-Liga side, Lokomotive Stendal, but saw the clubs relegated to the third-tier Bezirksliga in 1983. His last management job saw him take over Chemie Ilmenau for the 1983–84 season, but the team only finished in 9th place. Until 2006, Ohm served on the board of Lok Stendal.

Honors 
 DDR-Oberliga: 4
 1964, 1972, 1974, 1975
 FDGB-Pokal: 1
 Winner 1969

References 

1944 births
East German football managers
East German footballers
FC Sachsen Leipzig players
German football managers
1. FC Magdeburg players
2020 deaths
DDR-Oberliga players
Association football defenders
Footballers from Saxony-Anhalt
People from Börde (district)
People from Bezirk Magdeburg